Ajesh Yadav is an Indian politician and is member of the Sixth Legislative Assembly of Delhi. He is a member of the Aam Aadmi Party and represents Badli (Assembly constituency) of Delhi.

Early life and education
Ajesh Yadav was born in Delhi in 1967. He attended Delhi University and attained Bachelor of Arts degree. He was businessperson prior to entering politics.

Political career
Ajesh Yadav has been a MLA for one term. In 2008 he contested Fifth Legislative Assembly of Delhi elections as a candidate of Bahujan Samaj Party from Badli (Delhi Assembly constituency). He is currently a member of the Aam Aadmi Party and represents the Badli (Delhi Assembly constituency).

Member of Legislative Assembly
In 2015 he was elected to the Sixth Legislative Assembly of Delhi. In 2020 he was elected to the Seventh Legislative Assembly of Delhi.

Member of Legislative Assembly (2020 - present)
Since 2020, he is an elected member of the 7th Delhi Assembly.

Committee assignments of Delhi Legislative Assembly
 Member (2022-2023), Committee on Government Undertakings

Electoral performance

See also

Sixth Legislative Assembly of Delhi
Aam Aadmi Party

References 

Delhi MLAs 2015–2020
Delhi MLAs 2020–2025
Aam Aadmi Party politicians from Delhi
People from New Delhi
1968 births
Living people